International Press Institute World Press Freedom Heroes are individuals who have been recognized by the Vienna-based International Press Institute for "significant contributions to the maintenance of press freedom and freedom of expression" and "indomitable courage". The first 50 "heroes" were selected on the occasion of the organization's 50th anniversary in 2000, and awarded at its World Congress in Boston. As of 2021, 22 additional heroes have been added to the list, several of them posthumously.

Recipients

References

Awards established in 2000
Journalism awards
Free expression awards